Anjaparidze is a Georgian surname. Notable people with the surname include:

Veriko Anjaparidze (1897–1987), Georgian stage and cinema actress
Zurab Anjaparidze (1928–1997), Georgian tenor

See also
Japaridze

Georgian-language surnames